Aethalura intertexta, the four-barred gray or smoky carpet moth, is a moth in the family Geometridae. The species was first described by Francis Walker in 1860. It is found in North America.

The MONA or Hodges number for Aethalura intertexta is 6570.

Subspecies
Two subspecies belong to Aethalura intertexta:
 Aethalura intertexta fumata (Barnes & McDunnough, 1917) i g
 Aethalura intertexta intertexta (Walker, 1860) i g
Data sources: i = ITIS, c = Catalogue of Life, g = GBIF, b = BugGuide

References

Further reading

 

Boarmiini
Articles created by Qbugbot
Moths described in 1860
Moths of North America